Neon Festival is a biennial music festival held in Turkey. The festival began in the 4th biggest city of Turkey, called Bursa in 2015.

History

2015 
The first edition of the festival took place on 13th of July to 19th of July in Alacam / Bursa. Inside of a magical forest with thousands of attendees

2021 
Postponed to 2022 - The second edition of the festival will take place in Lifepark, Istanbul on 3rd of July 2021. It's a one-day festival with 18 hrs. performances.

2022 
The second edition is a one day festival in Lifepark, Sariyer - Istanbul on 28 of May 2021.

Overview / Stages 
Neon Festival features a number of international psychedelic music acts from genres including psytrance, dark psy, Goa trance, full-on, forest, chill-out, psybient, ambient and reggae. There are two stages; Main Stage and Chill/Reggae Stage.

Recycle and Sustainability / Stages 
Neon Festival is also called a transformational festival, as almost every stage and art piece of the festival has been created by recycled products. Neon doesn't work with sponsor or any entertainment companies.

Events and Installations 
 3D Sound System
 4D Dance Floor
 Art Gallery
 Yoga and Healing Area
 Main Stage & Chill-Reggae Stage
 Attractions, Games and Water activities

Decor, Sound and Stage Design 
Fully designed atelier has been produced by Neon Festival design team, led by stage masters and artists. Funktion-One Sound System has been used in 2014 edition.

Arts and Galleries / Artists 
 Alex Grey
 Allyson Grey

Editions Summary

See also
List of electronic music festivals
Boom Festival
Ozora Festival

References

External links 
 
 Official Facebook Page 
 Official Facebook 2015 Event Page
 Official Facebook 2021 Event Page 
 GoaBase
 Kanal D min. 40
 Haber7
 Renklisen 
 Milliyet
 Posta
 Sabah
 Hürriyet
 Olay
 DHA

Music festivals established in 2014
Transformational festivals
Summer festivals
Festivals in Bursa
Electronic music festivals in Turkey
Summer events in Turkey

tr:Neon Uluslararası Müzik ve Sanat Festivali